PHC or PhC may refer to:

Cities
Port Harcourt, Nigeria

Courts
Peshawar High Court in Peshawar, Pakistan

Education
Candidate of Philosophy (Candidatus/Candidata Philosophiae), an academic degree
Patrick Henry College, a college in Purcellville, Virginia, United States
Pacific Harbors Council

Health care
Hawaii Prepaid Health Care Act 
Partnership HealthPlan of California, a Medicaid health plan 
Philippine Heart Center, hospital for heart illnesses in the Philippines
Primary health care
Primary Health Centre, health care provider in developing nations
PH Consulting SRL, health care industry consultants in LATAM 
Primary Health Centre (India)

Religion
Pentecostal Holiness Church
Perth Hebrew Congregation of Menora, Western Australia

Science and technology
Password Hashing Competition
Polyhalogenated compound
Poly(hexamethylene carbonate)
Poly(hydridocarbyne)

Transport
Port Harcourt International Airport, Nigeria, IATA code

Entertainment
A Prairie Home Companion, a radio show on American Public Media

Music
Post-hardcore, a subgenre of hardcore